Emilie Machut (born 13 January 1997) is a French kickboxer. A professional competitor since 2016, she is the former ISKA World and European Full Contact Atomweight champion.

Kickboxing career
Machut made her professional debut against Debora Varcica at Fight Stadium on May 7, 2016, for the ISKA European title. She won the fight by unanimous decision.

In her next fight, Emilie Machut was scheduled to face Yanira Martin at Fight Stadium on March 11, 2017, for the ISKA World Atomweight Full Contact title. She won the fight by unanimous decision.

Machut was scheduled to face the K-1 Krush flyweight champion Kana Morimoto at Krush 79 on August 20, 2017. Machut suffered her first career knockout loss, after being knocked out by a left hook in the first round.

Machut was scheduled to fight Francesca Bartolini at Fight Stadium III on March 3, 2018. Machut won the fight by a unanimous decision.

Machut next faced Whitney Shepard at Whitney Shepard on September 29, 2018. Machut won the fight by a unanimous decision.

Machut was scheduled to face Silvia Mezzolato at Fight Stadium IV, on March 9, 2019. The fight was a unanimous decision.

During Enfusion: Ece 1 Machut faced the ISKA Atomweight K1 and future Enfusion 52 kg champion Cristina Morales. Morales won the fight a unanimous decision.

Machut was scheduled to face Marine Mazeau at The Stars Of Thai Boxing VI on January 25, 2020. Machut won the fight by a unanimous decision.

Machut was booked to defend her ISKA World title against Simona Di Dio Martello at GFCT 6 on June 27, 2021. She lost the fight by unanimous decision.

Machut was scheduled to face Aleksandra Madraszewska at K-1 French Tour on December 18, 2021. The bout was later cancelled for undisclosed reasons. Machut was booked to face Dimitra Agathangelidou at Bacho Cup on April 23, 2022. She won the fight by decision.

Machut faced Beatrice Insola at Evolution Fight on July 30, 2022. She won the fight by a second-round knockout.

Machut faced Adrianna Jedraczka at Fight of Clovis on December 10, 2022.

Championships and accomplishments
International Sport Karate Association
ISKA European Full Contact Atomweight Championship
ISKA World K-1 Atomweight Championship

Kickboxing record
 
|-  bgcolor="#CCFFCC"
| 2022-12-10 || Win ||align=left| Adrianna Jedraczka || Fight au Clovis || Soissons, France || KO (Body kick) || 1 || 
|-  bgcolor="#CCFFCC"
| 2022-07-30 || Win ||align=left| Beatrice Insola || Evolution Fight XIX || Syracuse, Sicily || KO || 2 || 
|-  bgcolor="#CCFFCC"
| 2022-04-23 || Win ||align=left| Dimitra Agathangelidou || Bancho Cup || Thurins, France || Decision  || 3 || 3:00
|-  bgcolor="#fbb"
| 2021-06-27 || Loss ||align=left| Simona Di Dio Martello || GFCT 6 || Saint-Martin-en-Haut, France || Decision (Unanimous) || 5 || 3:00
|-
! style=background:white colspan=9 |
|-
|-  bgcolor="#CCFFCC"
| 2020-01-25 || Win||align=left| Marine Mazeau || The Stars Of Thai Boxing VI || Marcq-en-Barœul, France || Decision (Unanimous) || 3 || 3:00
|-
|-  bgcolor="#FFBBBB"
| 2019-06-07 || Loss||align=left| Cristina Morales || Enfusion: Ece 1 || Tenerife, Spain || Decision (Unanimous) || 3 || 3:00
|-
|-  bgcolor="#CCFFCC"
| 2019-03-09 || Win||align=left| Silvia Pezzolato || Fight Stadium IV || Tergnier, France || Decision (Unanimous) || 3 || 3:00
|-
|-  bgcolor="#CCFFCC"
| 2018-09-29 || Win||align=left| Whitney Shepard || White Collar Boxing || Galway, Ireland || Decision (Unanimous) || 3 || 3:00
|-
|-  bgcolor="#CCFFCC"
| 2018-03-03 || Win||align=left| Francesca Bartolini || Fight Stadium III || France || Decision (Unanimous) || 3 || 3:00
|-
|-  bgcolor="#FFBBBB"
| 2017-08-20 || Loss||align=left| Kana Morimoto || Krush 79 || Tokyo, Japan || KO (Punch) || 1 || 1:55 
|-
|-  bgcolor="#CCFFCC"
| 2017-03-11 || Win||align=left| Yanira Martin || Fight Stadium II || Tergnier, France || Decision (Unanimous) || 5 || 3:00
|-
! style=background:white colspan=9 |
|-
|-  bgcolor="#CCFFCC"
| 2016-05-07 || Win||align=left| Debora Varcica || Fight Stadium I || Tergnier, France || Decision (Unanimous) || 5 || 3:00
|-
! style=background:white colspan=9 |
|-
|-
| colspan=9 | Legend:

See also
 List of female kickboxers
 List of female ISKA champions

References 

French female kickboxers
Living people
1997 births
Sportspeople from Pas-de-Calais